A.J. Carruthers is an Australian-born literary critic and experimental poet.

Biography 

A.J. Carruthers (also aj carruthers) was born in Sydney, and is of mixed/Asian heritage. Since 2011, he has been writing a long poem called AXIS. His critical work has focused on North American and contemporary Australian poetry and poetics. He is an editor of Southerly, Rabbit Poetry Journal and the founder of SOd press.

Published works 
Books
 Stave Sightings: Notational Experiments in North American Long Poems, 1961–2011 (New York: Palgrave Macmillan, 2017) 
 AXIS Book 1: Areal (Tokyo: Vagabond Press, 2014) 
 Opus 16 on Tehching Hsieh (Oakland, CA: GaussPDF, 2016) 
 Ode to On Kawara (Buffalo, NY: Hysterically Real, 2016) 
 The Tulip Beds: A Toneme Suite (Tokyo: Vagabond Press, 2013 
Anthologies
 Contemporary Asian Australian Poets (Sydney: Puncher & Wattmann, 2013)
 Active Aesthetics: Contemporary Australian Poetry (Berkeley, CA: Tuumba and Giramondo Press, 2016)
Exhibitions
 Selected Works (Non-Objective Writing, SNO Contemporary Art Projects)

References

External links 
 Biography and list of works at Austlit: the Australian Literature Resource
 Biography at Poetry and Poetics (Western Sydney University Writing Society)

Year of birth missing (living people)
Living people
Poets from Sydney
Australian literary critics